Elizabeth Polack was an English playwright of the 1830s, notable for being the first Jewish woman melodramatist in England.

Life and works

Few historical records survive which detail Elizabeth Polack's life.  Although neither the year nor place of her birth, nor her death, are now known, evidence of her activity as a playwright in London between 1830 and 1838 remains.  Contemporary records credit her with five plays, only two of which, Esther, the Royal Jewess; or The Death of Haman and St. Clair of the Isles; or The Outlaw of Barra, have survived. 
Alberti; or the Mines of Idria was performed at the Royal Pavilion on 10 May 1834 is believed to be by Polack. At the time,this play was incorrectly advertised as Alberti, or, the Mines of India in some publications.
Esther, with a story taken from the Old Testament, a version of the tradtitonal Jewish Purimshpil and considered in its time to be a type of an "Exotic East" melodrama, was successfully produced in 1835 at London's Royal Pavilion Theatre, Whitechapel in the East End (the Pavilion was later a centre for Yiddish theatre in London). Her St. Clair, however, based on an 1803 novel by Elizabeth Helme, met, when it debuted at the [Royal] Victoria Theatre in 1838, with a modest reception. It is apparently the source of the melodramatic cliché, "Foiled again!"

Polack's presumed aunt (or perhaps mother), Maria Polack, was one of the first Anglo-Jewish novelists. Polack may have also been related to Joel Samuel Polack, author of two well-received travel books about New Zealand. Joel's biographer writes that he lived with his sister in Piccadilly when he first returned to England; that sister may have been Elizabeth. Such a family background would have offered support to her writing career, even from her position within a marginalized community.

Plays by Elizabeth Polack
Alberti; or The Mines of Idria (no copy known to exist)
Angeline; or The Golden Chain (no copy known to exist)
Woman's Revenge (1832; attributed by some sources to John Howard Payne)
Esther, the Royal Jewess; or The Death of Haman (1835)
St. Clair of the Isles; or The Outlaw of Barra (1838)

Notes & references

Notes

References
Brown, Susan, et al. "Elizabeth Polack." Orlando: Women’s Writing in the British Isles from the Beginnings to the Present. Ed. Susan Brown, Patricia Clements, and Isobel Grundy. Cambridge University Press. Cambridge UP, n.d. 22 Mar. 2013. Accessed 17 Sept. 2022.
Conway, David (2012). Jewry in Music. Cambridge: Cambridge University Press. 
 Franceschina, John. "Introduction to Elizabeth Polack's Esther". British Women Playwrights Around 1800, 11 paragraphs. 15 October 2000.

Further reading
Bennett, Susan. "Genre trouble: Joanna Baillie, Elizabeth Polack — tragic subjects, melodramatic subjects." Women and playwriting in nineteenth-century Britain. Eds. Tracy C. Davis and Ellen Donkin. Cambridge, U.K.; New York: Cambridge University Press, 1999, pp. 215—232. (Open access, Internet Archive)
Carruthers, Jo. "Melodrama and the ‘art of government’: Jewish emancipation and Elizabeth Polack’s Esther, the Royal Jewess; or The Death of Haman!" Literature & History Volume 29, Issue 2 (November 2020):144–163. https://orcid.org/0000-0002-9125-4297 https://doi.org/10.1177/0306197320945947 (PDF/EPUB)

Jewish women writers
English Jews
English dramatists and playwrights
British women dramatists and playwrights
19th-century English women writers
19th-century British writers
19th-century deaths
Jewish theatre
Year of birth unknown
Place of birth unknown
Year of death unknown
Place of death unknown
Jewish dramatists and playwrights